Regi may refer to: 

 Reģi, a village in Alsunga Municipality in Latvia
 Regi Penxten (Belgian musician, born 1976), Belgian DJ and record producer
 László Régi (born 1911), Hungarian international football player
 María Vallet-Regí (born 1946), Spanish inorganic chemist
 Regirock, Regice, Registeel and Regigigas, Pokémon that were made of elements of the earth. Regieleki and Regidrago may also be a part of this group.

See also
 Regis (disambiguation)
 Reggie (disambiguation)
 Reg (disambiguation)